Megacyllene abnormis is a species of beetle in the family Cerambycidae. It was described by Per Olof Christopher Aurivillius in 1920.

References

Megacyllene
Beetles described in 1920